Geumsan County (Geumsan-gun; Korean: 금산군) is a county in South Chungcheong Province (Before 1963, Geumsan was in Jeollabuk-do), South Korea.

History
Administrative district name, Geumsan-gun, have nowadays was originate from the union of old Geumsan-gun and Jinsan-gun on March 1, 1914. The old Geumsan-gun was in Baekje Age called Jinnae-gun or Jinnaeeul-gun, and after Silla unified Three Kingdoms of Korea, its name was changed to Jinye-gun during the reign of King Gyeongdeok. In 1305 (Goryeo King Chungnyeol 31st year) it was promoted to Geumju-gun, including 5 hyeons, Buri-hyeon, Cheonggeo-hyeon, Mupung-hyeon, Jindong-hyeon, with Geumju governor to govern it. (Goryeosa 57th volume) In 1413 (Joseon Dynasty Taejong 13th year), (Geumju-gun) had its name changed to Geumsan-gun until the end of Joseon Age.

The old Jinsan-gun was in Baekjae Age called Jindong-hyeon. When Silla unified 3 nations, it became a subject hyeon of Hwangsan-gun.

It was changed to Okgyeo-bu in early Goryeo Age, and then became a part of Geumju-gun in 1305 (Goryeo King Chungnyeol 31st year).

In 1390 it had become a subject hyeon of Gosan-hyeon. During the Joseon dynasty, in 1393 (Taejo 2nd year), after burying the umbilical cord of Taejo in Maninsan Mountain, it was promoted to Jinju-gun and was governed by Jinju governor. In 1413 (Joseon Taejong 13th year) its name was again changed to Jinsan-gun. On August 4, 1896, as 13 dos were executed according to Royal Order 36th, Geumsan-gun and Jinsan-gun, which were a part of Gongju-bu, South Chungcheong Province, were incorporated into North Jeolla Province. As mentioned above, on March 1 of 1914(under Zenrahoku-dō), Jinsan-gun was united into the current Geumsan-gun. It first consisted of 10 myeons: Geumsanmyeon, Geumseong-myeon, Jewon-myeon, Buri-myeon, Gunbuk-myeon, Namil-myeon, Nami-myeon, Jinsan-myeon, Boksu-myeon, and Chubu-myeon. However, on November 1 of 1940, according to Ordinance 221st, Geumsan-myeon was promoted to Geumsan-eub, thus making one eub and nine myeons.

Later on January 1 of 1963, following the administrative district reorganization according to the law about the change of district boundaries (Law 1172nd) of Seoul-si, do, gun, gu, Geumsan-gun was incorporated into Chungcheongnam-do from Jeollabuk-do.

Geumsan-gun is famous for ginseng since late Goryeo Dynasty and nowaday it also has one of the biggest market of ginseng and medicinal herbs in Korea. Even though it doesn't produce as much ginseng as it did in the old days, it still produces more than 80% of ginseng distributed across South Korea.

Climate
Geumsan has a humid continental climate (Köppen: Dwa), but can be considered a borderline humid subtropical climate (Köppen: Cwa) using the  isotherm.

Economy

Geumsam is home to one of Hankook Tire's production facilities.

References

External links
 Official government website

 
Counties of South Chungcheong Province